USS Kennedy (DD-306) was a  built for the United States Navy during World War I.

Description
The Clemson class was a repeat of the preceding  although more fuel capacity was added. They had a crew of 6 officers and 108 enlisted men.

Performance differed radically between the ships of the class, often due to poor workmanship. The Clemson class was powered by two steam turbines, each driving one propeller shaft, using steam provided by four water-tube boilers.

The ships were armed with four 4-inch (102 mm) guns in single mounts and were fitted with two 1-pounder guns for anti-aircraft defense. In many ships a shortage of 1-pounders caused them to be replaced by 3-inch (76 mm) guns. Their primary weapon, though, was their torpedo battery of a dozen 21 inch (533 mm) torpedo tubes in four triple mounts. They also carried a pair of depth charge rails. A "Y-gun" depth charge thrower was added to many ships.

Construction and career
Kennedy, named for the 21st Secretary of the Navy and US Representative from Maryland, John P. Kennedy, was launched 15 February 1919 by Bethlehem Shipbuilding Corporation, San Francisco, California; sponsored by Mrs. Eugene F. Essner; and commissioned 16 August 1920. Kennedy arrived in San Diego, California, her homeport, 7 October 1920 and joined the Pacific Fleet in exercises and maneuvers along the West Coast from the Pacific Northwest to South America. Gunnery drills, torpedo practice, plane-guard duty, fleet problems, and war maneuvers with the Army kept Kennedy busy at sea.

During the spring of 1924, the destroyer transited the Panama Canal for fleet concentrations in the Caribbean. She returned San Diego 22 April to resume operations of her homeport. She sailed 13 June 1925 for a fleet problem and joint exercises off Hawaii. During this cruise she accompanied the Battle Fleet to Pago Pago, Samoa, and ports in Australia and New Zealand, returning San Diego 26 September. In 1927 she revisited the Caribbean for more exercises, this time calling at Norfolk, Virginia and New York before returning San Diego 22 May. Kennedy sailed once again 9 April 1928 for large scale maneuvers in Hawaiian waters, resuming operations out of San Diego 2 months later. After training cruises for reserves during the summer of 1929, Kennedy arrived in San Diego 27 September and decommissioned there 1 May 1930. Her hulk was sold 19 March 1931 and scrapped in accordance with the terms of the London Treaty limiting naval armament.

Notes

References

External links
http://www.navsource.org/archives/05/306.htm

 

Clemson-class destroyers
Ships built in San Francisco
1919 ships